String Quartet No. 7 is the seventh of seventeen works in the genre by the Brazilian composer Heitor Villa-Lobos, written in 1942. With a performance lasting approximately 37 minutes, it is the longest of Villa-Lobos's string quartets

History
Villa-Lobos composed his Seventh Quartet in Rio de Janeiro in 1942. The Quarteto Borgerth, to whom the score is dedicated, gave the first performance on 30 May 1945, at the Theatro Municipal in Rio de Janeiro.

Analysis
The quartet consists of four movements:
 Allegro 
 Andante 
 Scherzo (Allegro vivace) 
 Allegro giusto
Because of the exceptional virtuosity called for in all four movements, the composer suggested the Seventh Quartet might be called the "Concertante Quartet".

The first movement is a conscious updating of sonata form in accordance with a broad conception of post-tonal organization. It may be described, therefore, as a neoclassical work.

Discography
Chronological by date of recording.
 Heitor Villa-Lobos: String Quartets Nos. 2 and 7. Danubius Quartet (Mária Zs. Szabó and Adél Miklós, violins; Ágnes Apró, viola; Ilona Ribli, cello). Recorded at the Rottenbiller Street Studio  in Budapest, 12–16 November 1992. CD recording, 1 disc: digital, 12 cm, stereo. Marco Polo 8.223394. A co-production with Records International. Germany: HH International, Ltd., 1994.
 Heitor Villa-Lobos: Quartetos de cordas 7, 8, 9, 10, 11. Quarteto Amazônia. CD recording, 2 discs: digital, 12 cm, stereo. Barcelona: Discmedi D.L., 2000.
 Also issued as part of Villa-Lobos: Os 17 quartetos de cordas / The 17 String Quartets. Quarteto Bessler-Reis and Quarteto Amazônia. CD recording, 6 sound discs: digital, 12 cm, stereo. Kuarup Discos KCX-1001 (KCD 045, M-KCD-034, KCD 080/1, KCD-051, KCD 042). Rio de Janeiro: Kuarup Discos, 1996.
 Villa-Lobos: String Quartets, Volume 3. Quartets Nos. 7 and 15. Cuarteto Latinoamericano (Saúl Bitrán, Arón Bitrán, violins; Javier Montiel, viola; Alvaro Bitrán, cello). Recorded at the Sala Nezahualcóyotl in Mexico City, September 1996. Music of Latin American Masters. CD recording, 1 disc: digital, 12 cm, stereo. Dorian DOR-90246. Troy, NY: Dorian Recordings, 1997.
 Reissued as part of Heitor Villa-Lobos: The Complete String Quartets. 6 CDs + 1 DVD with a performance of Quartet No. 1 and interview with the Cuarteto Latinoamericano. Dorian Sono Luminus. DSL-90904. Winchester, VA: Sono Luminus, 2009.
 Also reissued (without the DVD) on Brilliant Classics 6634.

Filmography
 Villa-Lobos: A integral dos quartetos de cordas. Quarteto Radamés Gnattali (Carla Rincón, Francisco Roa, violins; Fernando Thebaldi, viola; Hugo Pilger, cello); presented by Turibio Santos. Recorded from June 2010 to September 2011 at the Palácio do Catete, Palácio das Laranjeiras, and the Theatro Municipal, Rio de Janeiro. DVD and Blu-ray (VIBD11111), 3 discs. Rio de Janeiro: Visom Digital, 2012.

References

Cited sources

Further reading
 Béhague, Gerard. 1979. Music in Latin America: An Introduction. New Jersey: Prentice-Hall.
 Béhaque, Gerard. 1994. Heitor Villa-Lobos: The Search for Brazil's Musical Soul. Austin: Institute of Latin American Studies, University of Texas at Austin.
 Béhague, Gerard. 2003. Villa-Lobos, Heitor: String Quartets, Cuarteto Latinoamericano. [review] Latin American Music Review / Revista de Música Latinoamericana 24, no. 2 (Autumn–Winter): 293–94.
 Estrella, Arnaldo. 1978. Os quartetos de cordas de Villa-Lobos, second edition. Rio de Janeiro: Museu Villa-Lobos, Ministério da Educação e Cultura.
 Farmer, Virginia. 1973. "An Analytical Study of the Seventeen String Quartets of Heitor Villa-Lobos". DMA diss. Urbana: University of Illinois at Urbana-Champaign.
 Gilman, Bruce. 1999. "Enigma de vanguardia", translated by Juan Arturo  Brennan. Pauta: Cuadernos de teoría y crítica musical 17, no. 69 (January–March): 29–34.
  Kraehenbuehl, David. 1957.  "George Rochberg: String Quartet, 1952. (Society for the Publication of American Music, 37th Season, 1956.) New York: Society for the Publication of American Music; distr.: Carl Fischer, 1957; Toch, Ernst. Dedication. For string quartet or string orchestra, with optional bass part. New York: Mills, 1957. Heitor Villa-Lobos: String Quartets, Nos. 4, 7, and 12. New York: Associated Music Publishers, 1956; Ernest Gold: String Quartet No. 1. (Society for the Publication of American Music, 37th Season, 1956.) New York: Society for the Publication of American Music; distr.: Carl Fischer, 1957".  Notes 15, no. 1 (December): 147.
 Macedo Ribeiro, Roberto. 2000. "A escrita contrapontística nos quartetos de cordas de Heitor Villa-Lobos". In Anais do I Colóquio de Pesquisa de Pós-Graduação, edited by Marisa Rezende and Mário Nogueira, 71–76. Rio de Janeiro: Universidade Federal do Rio de Janeiro (UFRJ) (Escola de Música).
 Tarasti, Eero. 2009. "Villa-Lobos's String Quartets". In Intimate Voices: The Twentieth-Century String Quartet, vol. 1: Debussy to Villa-Lobos, edited by Evan Jones, 223–55. Eastman Studies in Music 70. Rochester, NY: University of Rochester Press. ; ; .
 Villa-Lobos, sua obra: Programa de Ação Cultural. 1972. Second edition. Rio de Janeiro: MEC, DAC, Museu Villa-Lobos.
 Villa-Lobos, sua obra. 2009. Version 1.0. MinC / IBRAM, and the Museu Villa-Lobos. Based on the third edition, 1989.

String quartets by Heitor Villa-Lobos
1942 compositions
Music dedicated to ensembles or performers